Xınaxlı (also, Khynakhly) is a village and municipality in the Agdash Rayon of Azerbaijan.  It has a population of 480.

References 

Populated places in Agdash District